Oshisaka no Ōnakatsuhime (? – after 453) was Empress of Japan as the consort of Emperor Ingyō.

Daughter of Prince Wakanuke no Futamata; granddaughter of Emperor Ōjin. Gave birth to Emperor Ankō, Emperor Yūryaku and seven other children. Empress Dowager from 453.

First Son: 
First Daughter: 
Second Son: 
Third Son: , later Emperor Ankō (401?–456)
Second Daughter: 
Fourth Son: 
Fifth Son: , later Emperor Yūryaku
Third Daughter: 
Fourth Daughter:

Notes

Japanese empresses
Year of death missing
5th-century Japanese women
Japanese princesses